Yoshio Aramaki (Aramaki Yoshio, 12 April 1933 –) is a science fiction and mystery writer, critic and art collector. His original given name was Kunio Aramaki (Aramaki Kunio). He has changed his name to Yoshimasa Aramaki. Aramaki is well known by his so-called "Meta-SF" works which are characterized by their speculative and fantastic themes and depictions. He is also famous for his various series of "imaginary battle" novels and alternate history novels such as Konpeki no Kantai series. He is a member of the Japan Writers’ Association, and of the SFWJ (Science Fiction and Fantasy Writers of Japan), and of the Contemporary Haiku Association. He was also a professor in the Seishū Women's University  (now, Sapporo International University) from 1993 to 1997.

Biography

Overview
Aramaki was born in 1933 in Otaru in Hokkaidō prefecture. He graduated from Hokkaidō Minami Sapporo high school. He graduated from Waseda University. He became an employee at a publishing company and worked in Tokyo. But he returned to Sapporo to take over his family business. 
Aramaki entered school again and graduated from the department of technology, civil engineering course, in the Hokkai Gakuen University Junior College Division, and obtained an architect degree. He took office as a representative director in Hokken Shōji Co. Ltd.

He joined the Hokkaidō science fiction club and contributed various stories and critiques to the magazine "CORE" from 1965 to 1967. In 1970, Aramaki presented a critique "Theory of Novels by Kunst" (Jutsu no Shōsetsu-ron) in S-F Magazine in response to Kōichi Yamano Here, Aramaki analyzed the Robert Heinlein's works by using the concept of "fiction by Kunst", thereby he advocated the new possibilities of Japanese SF works in this critique. He also published his allegorical short story "Ōinaru Shōgo (The Great Noon)" in the same publication. He thus he debuted as a writer and a critic in the same publication.

Aramaki wrote novels New Wave science fiction and Surrealism. At the same time, he also wrote Space opera stories such as the "Big Wars" series and so on. His short story "Yawarakai Tokei" (
"Soft Clocks"),  took its central motif from the picture by Salvador Dalí. It translated into English and appeared in the British SF magazine Interzone in 1989 to some acclaim.

His early speculative novelette "Shirakabe no Moji wa Yūhi ni Haeru" (The Writings on the White Wall are Shined On By the Setting Sun) won the Seiun Award in 1972. His first full-length and the first volume of the"Shiraki series, Shiroki Hi Tabidateba Fushi (Departing on the White Day, That Is, Immortality), was a runner-up for the Izumi Kyōka Prize for Literature.

Aramaki wrote many "Denki-Roman stories" (Legendary Roman story) in the 1980s and 1990s. He also wrote many "imaginary battle / alternate history" stories from the middle 1980s to ca. 2000. They are "Yōsai series" (Fortress series) and "Fleet series" which contains "Konpeki no Kantai series (Deep Blue Fleet)" and "Kyokujitsu no Kantai series (Fleet of the Rising Sun)". He published the critique "Discovery of Simulation Novels" (Shimyureeshon shōsestu no hakken)  in 1994.

After 2000, he published the books of the Corridor of Super Strings - Atlantis Big Wars series and other work.

In November 2014, he commenced publication of the Teihon Aramaki Yoshio Meta-SF Zenshū ( (Aramaki Yoshio Complete and Standard Collection of Meta-SF Works). The publication of this collection was completed in July 2015. The Collection is made up of seven main volumes and one extra. In July 2017, Aramaki published the last volume of his meta-SF series, Shiraki series Mohaya Uchū wa Meikyū no Kagami no yōni ("Now the Cosmos is Like the Mirrors of Labyrinth".

Aramaki was the owner of the Sapporo Tokeidai gallery. He is known as a collector of the paintings of the artists in Hokkaidō. Many paintings in the  collection were donated to the Sapporo Arts Forest Museum.

Early career 
Aramaki has stated the origin of his surreal and "speculative" emotions had their root in his birthplace, Otaru. The circumstances in the young days might form his basis of imaginations. The land Hokkaidō and early experiences were the important elements of his later works.

Aramaki went to the metropolis Tokyo and studied psychology in Waseda University from 1954 to 1957. He worked several years in a publishing company in Tokyo. Aramaki had the ambition to be a professional writer in those days. But he did not stay in Tokyo. When he faced the violent and chaotic movement against the renewal of the Treaty of Mutual Cooperation and Security Between the United States and Japan in 1960, he was disappointed at the ideals of the Socialist revolution and abandoned his ambition. Aramaki left Tokyo and returned to Hokkaidō to take over his family business.

After returned to Sapporo, Aramaki joined a SF club and operated its coterie magazine CORE from 1965 to 1967. In this magazine, he contributed many critiques and stories. One, "Shimi" appeared in the first issue of CORE magazine, and which formed an early vision of his debut story "Ōinaru Shōgo". Then he wrote and published the critical essays on Arthur C. Clarke's Childhood's End, Philip K. Dick's The Man in the High Castle and Yasutaka Tsutsui's Tōkaidō War 

Aramaki joined Takumi Shibano's fan maagzineUchūjin. He contributed various critiques and stories to it. Aramaki contributed the series of critical essays on American science fiction, in which Aramaki tried to understand America and its culture, which had defeated Japan in the Pacific War. These essays would lead to the later Fleet series such as Konpeki no Kantai. Aramaki also published his short story "The Breakwater to Time (Toki no Bōhatei)" ", which is a prototype of "The Great Noon (Ōinaru Shōgo)". Hepublished the counterargument against Yamano's criticism. It was beginning of the so-called "Yamano-Aramaki debate"

Debate between Aramaki and Yamano 
In the late 1960s, New Wave science fiction works such as those by Ballard and Dick and of the philosophically inclined unrelated work of Stanislaw Lem had begun to get noticed by Japanese science fiction readers and writers. Kōichi Yamano' published his critical article "Nihon SF no Genten to Shikō" (Japanese SF: Its Originality and Orientation)  in S-F Magazine in 1969. Yamano described existing Japanese as imitations of American SF. With no original Japanese SF works having been written, he suggested a new movement towards it.

Aramaki, in opposition to this Yamano's criticism, contributed his opinions to the fan magazine Uchūjin. Aramaki was also searching for new possibilities of Japanese SF. In 1969, Aramaki and Yamano debated. Yamano advocated the New SF in Japan. He began publishing his Quarterly NW-SF Magazine (Kikan NW-SF) in 1970. On the other hand, Aramaki published his critical article "Jutsu no Shōsetsu-ron" in S-F Magazine in 1970. Aramaki took his own course of speculative and surreal fiction. Aramaki started publishing his unique metafictional works.

 Early metafictional stories in S-F Magazine 
After the debut as a writer in 1970, Aramaki went forth with his published his "metafiction" novelettes in S-F Magazine from 1970 to around 1973. For details see bibliography below.

Aramaki's first novel "Shiroki Hi tabidateba Fushi" (the first book of the Shiraki series) was published in April 1972. His early masterpiece Shinsei-dai ("The Sacred Era") was published in May 1978, a short story versin of it having appeared in S-F Magazine in 1970.

 Space opers and work in other genres
Aramaki tried to explore story themes in a variety of genres and styles. In 1975, he published Kūhaku no Jūjika ("Vacant Cross") an occult novel set in contemporary Japan. This is the first book of the Kūhaku series. "Tennyo no Misshitsu" in 1977 is a locked room mystery. Ōgon Mayu no Nemuri (1976) is also set in current day Japan, like Kūhaku series, the stage is contemporary Japan. This is the first book of the Kimmeria Nanatsu no Hihō ("The Seven Secret Treasures of Kimmeria") series.

Aramaki wrote the space opera stories. Kami naru Eien no Kaiki in 1978. It wasa the first book of the Big Wars series. The stories in this series are more hard science fiction.

In 1980, he published Megami-tachi no Gogo ("Afternoon of Goddesses"), a collection of novelettes. Each story features a young woman protagonist.

Meanwhile, Aramaki had graduated from the department of engineering, and was an engineer and an architect.

 "Imaginary Battle" and alternative history works
Aramaki published "Niseko Yōsai 1986 part 1 - Rishiri-Rebun Tokkō-hen (ニセコ要塞1986 [1] - 利尻・礼文特攻篇 Niseko Fortress 1986). This is the first book of twenty volume Yōsai (Fortress) series (. The last book of this series Fugaku Yōsai 3, the Apocalypse Program was published in December 2001.

While writing the series, Aramaki started to publish the new alternative history series, "Kantai Series" ( Fleet Series). The first volume was "Konpeki no Kantai 1". In 1992, Aramaki started publishing the Kyokujitsu no Kantai Series in addition. Sixty-there volumes were published from 1990 to 2000. These convey an alternative version of World War II.

The Kantai Series as adapted into several console games, manga, and anime. The anime series were especially well-known. More than five million copies were sold.

 Nippon 2007 and criticism activities 
In August 2007, Nippon 2007, the first World SF Convention in Asia, took place at Yokohama. A panel on steampunk and Alternate history took place with Fumio Takano, Masaaki Shindo, Haruaki Utsukibara, Tadashi Nagase, and Aramaki were panelist. Aramaki also became a panelist in the "New wave/ Speculative fiction" panel.

Spurred by this, Aramaki joined the critique site "Speculative Japan" which was founded by translator Mamoru Masuda JA). He contributed many critiques to this site. In 2008, Aramaki rejoined the SFWJ and began to take a role in Japanese SF criticism. The SFWJ had established the Nihon SF Critique Award in 2006. Aramaki served as a chief of the selection committee from 4th to 7th award. The new critics such as Yoshiyuki Ishiwa, Akira Okawada, Maki Takatsuki  etc., have debuted through this award.

In 2014, the literary exhibition "Aramaki Yoshio no Sekai" (The World of Aramaki Yoshio) was held in Hokkaido Museum of Literature at Sapporo from February 8 to March 23. The project of this event started from the one design drawing which Aramaki had asked architect Tsuneyo Matsuhashi  to draw for showing the structure of the City-type Starship, appeared in the Big Wars series, in 1983. And during these 30 years, Shōichi Nakano  had created many CG images of this starship scenes. Thereby the exhibition of the CG arts and its original writer Aramaki was planned and held. Among various events, the Panel "The Origin of the World of Aramaki Yoshio" took place. Aramaki, Takayuki Tatsumi, Mari Kotani, Denis Taillandier and two others were panelist. Aramaki talked his origins of a writer.

 Awards 
 1972 Seiun Award (Best Japanese Short Story), for Shirakabe no Moji wa Yūhi ni Haeru 
 2012 Hokkaidō Shinbun Literature Award (in division of poetry), for Poetry Gaikotsu Hantō (Skelton Peninsula) 
 2012 Medal of Dark blue ribbon (Konju Hōshō) 
 2013 Sapporo Arts Award 
 2023 43rd Nihon SF Taisho Award for Collected Essays on Science Fiction 

 Works 
 Novels 
Note 1: /col/ indicates a book is a collection of short stories and novelettes.
Note 2: If books belong to the certain series, the first book of the series is shown here. There are exceptions.
 Shirakabe no Moji wa Yūhi ni Haeru /col/ (The Writings on the White Wall are Shined by the Setting Sun) 1972-04 Hayakawa Publishing 
 Shiroki Hi Tabidateba Fushi (Departing on the White Day, that is, Immortality)  1972-12 Hayakawa Publishing 
 Kūhaku no Jūjika (The Vacant Stauros [Cross])  1975-05 Shodensha 
 Toki no Ashibune /col/ (The Reed Ship of Time) 1975-07 Bunka Shuppankyoku 
 Ōgon Mayu no Nemuri (The Sleep of the Golden Cocoon)  1976-09 Tokuma Shoten 
 Tennyo no Misshitsu (Closed Room of Heavenly Maiden)  1977-11 Jitsugyo no Nihon Sha 
 Aru Hareta Hi no Wien wa Mori no naka ni Tatazumu /col/ (On a Certain, Fine Day, Stands Wien in the Forest) 1980-08 Kodansha 
 Shinsei-dai 1978-05 Tokuma Shoten  
 English version: The Sacred Era 2017-06 University of Minnesota Press  amazon.com
 Kami naru Eien no Kaiki (The Thundering Divine of the Eternal Return)  1978-09 Tokuma Shoten 
 Yawarakai Tokei /col/ (Soft Clocks)1978-11 Tokuma Shoten 
 Uchū Nijūgo-ji /col/ (The Space 25 O'clock) 1978-12 Tokuma Shoten 
 Shinshū Byakuma-den - Klein no Tasubo no Maki (White Devil Legend in the Divine Province - Volume of Klein Bottle)  1979-01 Kisotengai Sha 
 Solomon no Hihō (Solomon's Secret Treasure)  1980-07 Tokuma Shoten 
 Megami-tachi no Gogo - Aoi Tabi no Sakuhin-shū /col/ (The Afternoon of goddesses - Stories from the Blue Travel) 1980-12 Kadokawa Shoten
 Abandandero no Kai-kikai /col/ (Pleasure Machine of Abandondero) 1981-03 Kadokawa shoten 
 Walpurgis no Yoru /col/ (The Night of Walpurgis) 1981-07 Kadokawa Shoten /bunko/ 
 Satsui no Myōō (Murderous Intent of Vidya-raja [Wisdom King])  1981-11 Yuraku Shuppan 
 Castrovalva /col/ 1983-12 Chuokoron Sha ja:中央公論社
 Faust Jidai (The Faust Age) 1982-11 Kodansha 
 Mū Tairiku no Shihou(The Supreme Treasure in the Mu Continent)  1984-02 Kadokawa Shoten 
 Yoshitsune Maihō Densetsu Satsujin Jiken (Murder affair of the Yoshitsune's Buried Treasure Legend) 	1985-10 Kodansha 
 Kodai Kagome-zoku no Inbō (Conspiracy by the Ancient Kagome Family)  1985-10 Tokuma Shoten 
 Niseko Yōsai 1986 part 1 - Rishiri-Rebun Tokkō-hen ( Niseko Fortress 1986, part 1, Rishiri-Rebun Special Attack)  1986-07 Chuokoron Sha 
 Maboroshi Bunmei no Tabi - Kūsō Kojiki /col/ (Travels to the Visionary Civilizations - Kojiki in Fantasy) 1986-09 Tokuma Shoten   C0193
 Sei-Stefan Jiin no Kane no Ne wa (The Sounding Bells of the Saint Stefan Cathedral)  1988-05 Tokuma Shoten 
 Nekosenshi Chō D-kyū Keikaku (Cat warrior, the Super Dyson Sphere Project) 1989-06 Tairiku Shobo 
 Sarutobi Sasuke : Kishu Densetsu no Kan - Tanjō-hen  1998-10 Kadokawa Shoten 
 Konpeki no Kantai 1, Unmei no Kaisen (Deep Blue Fleet 1, Fate of Starting a War)  1990-12 Tokuma Shoten 
 Kyokujitsu no Kantai 1, Chōsenkan Yamato Takeru no Mikoto Shutsugeki (Fleet of the Rising Sun, Sally of Super Battleship Prince Yamato Takeru)  1992-06 Chuokoron Sha 
 Shin Konpeki no Kantai zero (0), Itsuwari no Heiwa (New Deep Blue Fleet 1, Deceptive Peace)  1997-04 Tokuma Shoten 
 Shin Kyokujitsu no Kantai zero (0), Yumemiru Chōsenkan (New Fleet of the Rising Sun, Dreaming Super Battleship)  1997-06 Chuokoron Sha 
 Teikoku no Hikari 1, Venture 2025 (Light of the Empire 1, Venture 2025)  1997-08 Gentoha 
 Kyokujitsu no Kaisen, Nichiro-sensō no Chiseigaku 1998-12 Kadokawa Shoten 1998.12 
 Kyokujitsu no Senkan, Sōseki to Mikasa (Battleship of Rising Sun, Sōseki and Mikasa) 1999-07 Kadokawa Shoten 
 PLUG 2002-01 Kadokawa Shoten 
 Chōgen Kairō - Atlantis Taisen 1 (The Corridor of Super Strings - Atlantis Big War 1)  2003-04 Chuokoron Sha 
 Romanov Teikoku no Yabou - Nihon Seifuku Sensō (The Ambition of the Romanov Empire - The War for Conquring Japan) 2010-05 Chuokoron Sha 
 Teihon Aramaki Yoshio Meta-SF Zenshū, Dai-3 kan "Shiroki Hi Tabidateba Fushi" /col/ (Aramaki Yoshio Complete and Standard Collection of Meta-SF Works, volume 3) 2014-11 Sairyūsha :ja:彩流社The first release of a volume of the Complete Collection of Meta-SF Works. The 3rd volume.
 Mohaya Uchū wa Meikyū no Kagami no yōni (Now the Cosmos is Like the Mirrors of Labyrinth) The last book of the Shiraki series. The Series, trilogy, has been completed. Aramaki was 84, and completed his "meta-SF" series. 2017-07 Sairyu Sha 

 Metafiction novels 
 Shiraki Series 1972–2017, 3 volumes
 Shiroki Hi Tabidateba Fushi (Departing on the White Day, that is, Immortality) 1972-12 Hayakawa Publishing 
 Sei-Stefan Jiin no Kane no Ne wa (The Sounding Bells of the Saint Stefan Cathedral) 1988-05 Tokuma Shoten
 Mohaya Uchū wa Meikyū no Kagami no yōni (Now the Cosmos is Like the Mirrors of Labyrinth) 2017-07 Sairyu Sha 

 Early metafiction novelettes 
Aramaki published around 15 metafictional novelettes in S-F Magazine in the early 1970s. These take place around fifty years in the future (from the time written). They had fallen into comparative obscurity. In 2013, French culture studies researcher Denis Taillandier published the paper discussing and evaluating Aramaki's early short story "Soft Clocks". The revaluation of Aramaki's metafictional works were started. In the course of the renewed interest, publication of the "Complete Collection of Meta-SF Works was planned.

The following list shows the early metafictional novelettes and short stories appeared in S-F from 1970 to ca. 1973:

 Roman-fleuve SF Novels 
 Big Wars series 1978-1998

 Denki Roman Novel series 
 Kūhaku series (Vacancy series) 1975-1987
 Kimmeria Nanatsu no Hihō series (Seven Secret Treasures of Kimmeria series) 1976-1981
 Shimanari series (Shimanari series) 1977, 1979
 Byakuma-den series (White Devil Legend series) 1979 (uncompleted)
 Hihō series (Secret Treasures series) 1980-1985
 Maihō Densetsu series (Buried Treasure Legend series) 1985-1900
 Myōō series (Wisdom King series) 1981-1991
 Mū series (Mū series) 1984-1987
 Sasuke series (Sasuke series) 1989-1992

 Imaginary Battle / Alternate History series 
 Yōsai Series ( Fortress Series) 1986–2001, 20 volumes
 Niseko Yōsai 1986 1-3 ( 1986, Niseko Fortress 1986) 1986-1988
 Towada Yōsai 1991 1-3 ( 1991, Towada Fortress 1991) 1989
 Aso Yōsai 1995 1-5 ( 1995, Aso Fortress 1995) 1990-1991
 Biwako Yōsai 1997 1-6 ( 1997, Biwako Fortress 1997)
 Fugaku Yōsai 1-3 (Fugaku Fortress) 2001
 Kantai Series (Fleet Series) 1990–2000, 63 volumes 
 Konpeki no Kantai Series 1-20 (Deep Blue Fleet series) 1990-1996 Tokuma Shoten
 Kyokujitsu no Kantai Series 1-16 (Fleet of Rising Sun series) 1992-1996 Chuokoron Sha
 Shin Konpeki no Kantai Series 0, 1-8 (New Deep Blue Fleet series) 1997-2000 Tokuma Shoten (0), Gentosha (1-8)
 Shin Kyokujitsu no Kantai Series 0, 1-17 (New Fleet of Rising Sun series) 1997-2000 Chuo Kouron Sha, Shin Chuokoron Sha

 Simulation Novel series 
 Teikoku no Hikari Series 1-2 (Light of the Empire series) 1997 Gentosha
 Chōgen Kairō Series 1-6 (The Corridor of Super Strings series) 2003-2008 Shin Chuokoron Sha

 Young Adult fictio 
 Gomannen-go no Natsuyasumi 1978-11 Tsuru Shobō - (Jikan Kanshi-in series 1) 
 Midori no Uchū Guntō 1980-02 Kadokawa Shoten - (Jikan Kanshi-in series 2) /bunko/ 
 Seiun-Ki I Higeki no Ōji 1991-04 Keibun Sha 
 Seiun-Ki II Ōji no Shutsugeki 1991-09 Keibun Sha 

 Critique 
 Simulation Shōsetsu no Hakken 1994-12 Chuokoron Sha 

 Essays 
 Maboroshi Bunmei no Tabi - Kūsō Kojiki (Travels to the Visionary Civilizations - Kojiki in Fantasy) 1986-09 Tokuma Shoten   C0193
 Ryūkō Sakka no Dennō Shinan - Korenara dekiru Ichitarō 7 (Guide of Computer by a Popular Writer - How to use Ichitarō 7)  1997-01 Chuokoron Sha 
 Kyokujitsu no Kaisen, Nichiro-sensō no Chiseigaku 1998-12 Kadokawa Shoten 1998.12 
 Kyokujitsu no Senkan, Sōseki to Mikasa (Battleship in the Rising Sun, Sōseki and Mikasa) 1999-07 Kadokawa Shoten 
 Rōma-jin ga Egaita Sekaichizu (The World map drawn by the Romans) 2002-12 Seishun Shuppan Playbooks 
 Jinsei wa SF da ( 2013-01 Life is just SF) Iwasaki Insatsu Co. Ltd. /Private publication/ 

 Poetry 
 Shishū “Gaikotsu Hantō"’’ - Aramaki Yoshio Daiichi Shishū (‘’Skelton Peninsula’’) Private publication 2011-08 /Yoshio Sōsho 3/

 Complete Collection of Meta-SF Works Aramaki Yoshio Complete and Standard Collection of Meta-SF Works (Teihon Aramaki Yoshio Meta-SF Zenshū) edited and compiled by Takayuki Tatsumi + Yūji Miura:
 Volume 1 : Yawarakai Tokei (Soft Clocks) 2015-05 Sairyū Sha 
 Volume 2 : Uchū 25 ji (Uchū Nijū-go Ji) (The Space 25 O'clock) 2015-02 Sairyū Sha 
 Volume 3 : Shiroki Hi Tabidateba Fushi (Departing on the White Day, that is, Immortality) 2014-11 Sairyū Sha 
 Volume 4 : Sei-Stefan Jiin no Kane no Ne wa (The Sounding Bells of the Saint Stefan Cathedral) 2014-12 Sairyū Sha 
 Volume 5 : Toki no Ashibune (The Reed Ship of Time)  2015-01 Sairyū Sha 
 Volume 6 : Shinsei-dai (The Sacred Era) 2015-03 Sairyū Sha 
 Volume 7 : Castrovalva/Gothic (Castrovalva/ Gothic) 2015-04 Sairyū Sha 
 Extra Volume : Gaikotsu Hantō, Hanayome, etc. (Skelton Peninsula, Bride, etc.) 2015-01 Sairyū Sha 
 (Special Volume) : Mohaya Uchū wa Meikyū no Kagami no yōni (Now the Cosmos is Like the Mirrors of Labyrinth) 2017-07 Sairyū Sha , This book is not contained in the Complete Collection, but is essentially the part of the collection. After the Complete collection had been released, this book was published.

Novels adapted into manga and anime 
  Kantai Series 
  Konpeki no Kantai Series
  Kyokujitsu no Kantai Series

Selected works translated into English 
 The Sacred Era (Shinsei-dai) amazon.com page
 "'Soft Clocks" (Yawarakai Tokei), a novelette

Notes and references 

 List of Seiun Award

References 
 東雅夫＆石堂藍国書刊行会（2009） p.36
 巽孝之勁草書房 (2000)   pp.160-161
 日外アソシエーツ 
 (ja) Aramaki Yoshio Official Website retrieved, January 28, 2018
 (ja) 42nd Winners of Sapporo Arts Award, Sapporo city website retrieved, January 28, 2018
 (ja) Panel: Talking of Origin of Aramak SF on the Aramaki official site. retrieved, March 22, 2018.
 "Foreword: Apocrypha Now!" by Takayuki Tatsumi in The Sacred Era University of Minnesota Press (2017)

External links 
 Yoshio Aramaki in the Internet Speculative Fiction Database
 speculative japan (Internet Archive)
 (ja) SF Seminar 2008 report (Internet Archive)
 (ja) Sapporo Tokeidai Gallery (Internet Archive)

1933 births
Living people
Waseda University alumni
Japanese science fiction writers
Japanese alternate history writers
Japanese fantasy writers
Japanese mystery writers
20th-century Japanese novelists
21st-century Japanese novelists
Japanese art collectors
People from Otaru
Writers from Hokkaido